Banibrata Mukhopadhyay is an Indian Scientist/Astrophysicist and a professor of Physics at the Indian Institute of Science, Bangalore, India, born at Kolkatta, India to Pulak Mukhopadhyay, a biologist, and Tapati Mukhopadhyay, an academician.  Mukhopadhyay's mother tongue is Bengali.

Mukhopadhyay's work with his student Upasana Das has identified a mechanism to allow significantly super-Chandrasekhar white dwarfs to exist without collapsin.g into neutron stars, which could explain the origin of over-luminous type Ia supernovae. The idea of super-chandrashekar White-Dwarfs was proposed by physicists in the later 20th century, and Mukhopadhyay's work on these stars has not yet been confirmed observationally. The existence of Super-Chandrasekhar white-dwarfs itself is questionable. He has also proposed a solution to the century-old problem of the origin of linear instability and subsequent turbulence and matter transport in Rayleigh-stable pure hydrodynamical shear flows, which could explain turbulence in accretion disks, through the idea is not yet confirmed. His another work is able predict the spin of black holes and needs further observational verifications..

Research interests

Mukhopadhyay's research interests include black holes, white dwarfs and neutron stars (called as compact astrophysical objects), in general, relativistic, high energy and nuclear astrophysics; astrophysical fluid dynamics and other related/similar fluid flows; Einstein's general relativity and its possible modifications and their applications to understand enigmatic astrophysical observations; and field theory in curved spacetime including baryogenesis.

His work on Fluid Dynamics was featured in the Indian Express newspaper.

Awards and recognition

In recognition of his work, Mukhopadhyay has received the following awards:

 B. M. Birla Science Prize in Physics, 2012,
 Vainu Bappu Gold Medal, 2006,

References

Living people
Indian astrophysicists
Academic staff of the Indian Institute of Science
Scottish Church College alumni
University of Calcutta alumni
Year of birth missing (living people)